İlhan is a Turkish male given name and a surname. It is also used as a feminine given name. Notable with the name include:

Title
 Ilkhanate, Hulagu Khan's khanate, title of Hulagu Khan.

Given name
 İlhan Eker, Turkish footballer
 İlhan İrem, Turkish singer
 İlhan Koman, Turkish sculptor
 İlhan Mansız, Turkish football player
 İlhan Mimaroğlu, Turkish composer
 Ilhan Omar, American politician
 İlhan Onat, Turkish chess player
 İlhan Parlak, Turkish footballer
 İlhan Usmanbaş, Turkish composer

Surname
 Adem Ilhan, Turkish-English musician
 Attilâ İlhan, Turkish poet
 Çolpan İlhan, Turkish cinema and theatre actress
 John Ilhan, Australian businessman
 Marsel İlhan, Turkish tennis player
 Müfide İlhan, Turkish mayor

Turkish-language surnames
Turkish masculine given names
Unisex given names